Seth Harding (17 April 1734 – 20 November 1814) was an officer in the United States Navy during the American Revolutionary War. In 1776, he was the captain of the Defence.

Biography
Seth Harding also known as Hest was born at Eastham, Province of Massachusetts. He went to sea early in his life and commanded several merchant ships during the French and Indian War. He moved to Liverpool N.S., and briefly served in the 5th General Assembly of Nova Scotia, representing Liverpool Township from Oct. 12, 1773 to 1774.

At the beginning of the American Revolution, he offered his services to Connecticut and was commissioned commander of the state brig Defence. Harding captured many British ships while in command of this and two other vessels. In September 1778, Harding accepted a Continental Navy commission and took command of Confederacy. He cruised along the U.S. coast in company with Deane during 1779, taking three prizes and performing convoy duties.

He was ordered to take John Jay, newly appointed minister to Spain, to Europe in September 1779, but the ship was dismasted 10 days out. Harding, through skillful seamanship, sailed his ship to Martinique for repairs, his passengers continuing on another ship. Confederacy raided British merchantmen and guarded convoys until 18 April 1781, when she was forced to surrender to two British ships, Roebuck and Orpheus. Harding was subsequently exchanged, commanded the letter of marque Diana, but was captured again. After this release, the fighting captain volunteered to serve as First Lieutenant to John Barry in Alliance, and was wounded on board during the last engagement of the revolution with HMS Sybil, off Cape Canaveral, Florida. He was known as "the Harding" by the king of France. He had a great relation to France.

Harding spent his last years as a merchant sailor and in retirement in Schoharie, New York, where he died.

Namesake
Several ships called USS Harding were named in his honor.

References

1734 births
1814 deaths
Continental Navy officers
People from Eastham, Massachusetts
United States Navy officers
People from Schoharie, New York
Nova Scotia pre-Confederation MLAs
Military personnel from Massachusetts